Bidental consonants are consonants articulated with both the lower and upper teeth. The diacritic for bidental consonants in the extensions to the IPA is the same superscript plus subscript bridge, . This is used for sounds most commonly found in disordered speech:

A bidental percussive, produced by striking the teeth against each other (gnashing or chattering the teeth).
A voiceless bidental fricative, a fricative made through clenched teeth with no involvement of the tongue or the lips, a "bidental (consonant) produced by air passing through the closed front teeth."
A voiced bidental fricative, .
Bidental aspiration of another consonant, e.g. .

There is at least one confirmed attestation of a bidental consonant in normal language. The Black Sea sub-dialect of the Shapsug dialect of Adyghe has a voiceless bidental fricative where other dialects have , as in хы  "six" and дахэ  "beautiful".

References

External links
 Chart of extended IPA symbols for disordered speech (PDF)

Place of articulation